The golden-bellied white-eye (Zosterops uropygialis) is a species of bird in the family Zosteropidae. It is native to the Kai Islands in Indonesia.

Its natural habitat is subtropical or tropical moist lowland forests. It is threatened by habitat loss.

References

golden-bellied white-eye
Birds of the Maluku Islands
golden-bellied white-eye
Taxonomy articles created by Polbot